The initialism SHCC may stand for the following, depending on context:

 Sacred Heart Canossian College, a girls-only secondary school in Hong Kong.
 Seaford Head Community College, a secondary school in Seaford, East Sussex, England.
 Shee Hindu Community Centre, a community centre and temple in Tyseley, Birmingham, West Midlands, England.
 Sleepy Hollow Country Club, a historic country club in Scarborough-on-Hudson in Briarcliff Manor, New York, USA
Singing Hills Christian Church, a fellowship of Christians in Hillsboro,  Oregon,  USA